Tom Walsh was a professional rugby league footballer who played in the 1900s and 1910s. He played at club level for Hunslet, as a forward (prior to the specialist positions of), during the era of contested scrums.

Playing career

Challenge Cup Final appearances
Tom Walsh played as a forward, i.e. number 13, in Hunslet's 14-0 victory over Hull F.C. in the 1907–08 Challenge Cup Final during the 1907–08 season at Fartown Ground, Huddersfield on Saturday 25 April 1908, in front of a crowd of 18,000.

County Cup Final appearances
Tom Walsh played as a forward, i.e. number 10, in Hunslet's 13-3 victory over Halifax in the 1905–06 Yorkshire County Cup Final during the 1905–06 season at Park Avenue, Bradford on Saturday 2 December 1905, and played as a forward, i.e. number 8, in the 17-0 victory over Halifax in the 1907–08 Yorkshire County Cup Final during the 1907–08 season at Headingley Rugby Stadium, Leeds on Saturday 21 December 1907.

All Four Cups, and "The Terrible Six"
Tom Walsh was a member of Hunslet's 1907–08 season All Four Cups winning team, the Forwards were known as "The Terrible Six" they were; Tom Walsh, Harry Wilson, Jack Randall, Bill "Tubby" Brookes, Bill Jukes, and John Willie Higson.

References

External links
Search for "Walsh" at rugbyleagueproject.org
1907-08 - Hunslet's Greatest Season 
Yorkshire Cup Final 1905 Hunslet v Halifax
Search for "Tom Walsh" "Rugby" at britishnewspaperarchive.co.uk

English rugby league players
Hunslet F.C. (1883) players
Place of birth missing
Place of death missing
Rugby league forwards
Year of birth missing
Year of death missing